A.V. Undercover was an American live music web series created by The A.V. Club, distributed on their website. The series premiered on March 16, 2010, ending after the 8th season in 2017.

The concept of the show is that each season, a list of 25 songs is compiled. Bands are then invited to choose a song to cover. Once a song has been played, it gets crossed off the list. The later a band comes on, the fewer songs they have to choose from. The first season, The A.V. Club staff picked the songs. The remaining seasons, readers of The A.V. Club voted for them. At the end of a season, there was an online vote for the favorite video.

In between season, there were mini seasons of Holiday Undercover (where each artist chose a song with a holiday theme) and Summer Break, where artists covered "songs having to do with summer".

In 2010, NPR selected "Wye Oak Covers The Kinks" as one of "Five Great Cover Songs From 2010 (So Far)". It was a 2011 Honoree for a Webby.

All episodes have since been deleted from YouTube.

The song that plays during the introduction is "Someone Has to Die" by Maritime.

Episodes

Season 1 (2010)

Holiday Undercover (2010)

Season 2 (2011)

Summer Break (2011)

Holiday Undercover (2011)

Season 3 (2012)

Summer Break (2012)

Season 4 (2013)

Summer Break (2013)

Holiday Undercover (2013)

Season 5 (2014)

Holiday Undercover (2014)

Season 6 (2015)

Holiday Undercover (2015)

Season 7 (2016)

The Day Of The Dead (2016)

Holiday Undercover (2016)

Guardians Of The Galaxy Vol. 2 (2017)

Season 8 (2017)

References

External links
 

American non-fiction web series
2010 web series debuts
2017 web series endings